Peter Rickmers was the name of a number of ships operated by Rickmers Line.

, built in 1867, sold in 1884 to Finland
, built in 1889, ran aground in 1908
, scuttled in 1914 as a blockship
, captured incomplete in 1945, completed as Empire Colne
, scrapped in 1986

See also
 Peter Rickmers (curler) (born 1979), German curler

References

Ship names